Pigeonhole is the first studio album by the British rock group New Fast Automatic Daffodils, released on Play It Again Sam in 1990.

It reached #49 on the British albums chart.

Critical reception
Trouser Press wrote that "the lyrics are not nearly as important as percussion, bass and the overall groove of the song; like James Brown, [Andy] Spearpoint is happy to riff on a particular theme to the point of nonsense."

Track listing 
 Get Better 3:52
 Fishes Eyes 7:04
 Working for Him 4:17
 Part 4 4:13
 Big 6:08
 You Were Lying When You Said You Loved Me 4:17
 Amplifier 3:57
 Reprise 3:47
 Partial 6:26
 Penguins 3:51
 I Found Myself In Another Room 3:51
 Pigeonhole 6:06

Personnel 
 Andy Spearpoint - vocals
 Dolan Hewison - guitar
 Justin Crawford - bass guitar
 Perry Saunders - drums
 Icarus Wilson-Knight - percussion

References 

1990 albums
New Fast Automatic Daffodils albums